The 2019 Women's U-19 European Handball Championship was the eleventh edition of the European Women's U-19 Handball Championship, held in Celje, Slovenia from 27 July to 7 August 2017.

Qualification

Draw 
The draw was held on 20 April 2017 in Paris.

Preliminary round 
All times are local (UTC+2).

Group A

Group B

Group C

Group D

Intermediate round

Group III

Group IV

Main round

Group I

Group II

Final round

Bracket 

Championship bracket

9th place bracket

5th place bracket

13th place bracket

13–16th place semifinals

9–12th place semifinals

5–8th place semifinals

Semifinals

15th place game

13th place game

Eleventh place game

Ninth place game

Seventh place game

Fifth place game

Third place game

Final

Final ranking

Tournament awards 
The all-star team and awards were announced on 6 August 2017.

All-star team

Awards

Statistics

Top goalscorers

References

External links 
 

European Women's U-19 Handball Championship
European Women's U-19 Handball Championship
International handball competitions hosted by Slovenia
European U-19
European Women's U-19 Handball Championship
Sport in Celje
2017 in Slovenian women's sport